Whessoe is a company based in Darlington and on Teesside in North East England. It was formerly a supplier of chemical, oil and nuclear plant and instrumentation, and today is a manufacturer of low temperature storage.

History

Background – W. and A. Kitching

The Whessoe Company traces its origins back to an iron foundry shop founded in 1790. The family business was inherited by William Kitching (d. 1850) and Alfred Kitchin (1808–1882), both Quakers, who established the Hope Town Foundry in Darlington in 1832.

Both William and Alfred Kitching were on the board of the Stockton and Darlington Railway, as well as being shareholders or its subsidiaries. and the company built several locomotives for the company, including subcontracted manufacturing and repair work from Timothy Hackworth. 0-6-0 Hackworth designed "Tory" class locomotive "Derwent", built 1845 is preserved as part of the National collection.

In 1860 the 'Hope Town Foundry' site was sold to the Stockton and Darlington Railway allowing the S&DR to extend its own site (see Hopetown Carriage Works), the works and equipment was moved to another site (later known as the Whessoe Foundry) also in Darlington. In 1861 A. Kitching was recorded as employing 45 people.

The business passed from the Kitchings to their cousin Charles I'anson. The term 'Whessoe Foundry' was first applied to Charles Ianson & Company in the 1860s, the name Whessoe being a locality name applied to the foundry.

From 1850 to 1890 the company expanded into the manufacture of steel structures, cranes, and gas works equipment. In 1881 the company became a limited liability company.

Whessoe Foundry Company
In 1890 the Whessoe Foundry Company Limited was formed, and in 1920 the company was publicly listed on the London Stock Exchange as Whessoe Foundry and Engineering Co Ltd, Shell acquired 51% of the shares. From 1890 onwards the company became focused on equipment for the gas and oil industries, such as gas holders, as well as making tunnel linings for underground railways, and later expanded into equipment for the nuclear and petrochemical industries.

Throughout this period the Heavy Engineering Divisions were major contractors in nuclear power, being involved with the design and construction of reactor vessels for most British stations from Calder Hall to the AGR (Advanced gas-cooler reactors) at Hunterston B and Hinkley B.

Whessoe LGA
Whessoe LGA Gas Technology retained its headquarters in Darlington, no longer with a factory but with construction operations worldwide in cryogenic and LT storage. This company was owned by the German company Preussag Noell, then bought by Skanska and later (2008) brought under Arabic ownership. In 2013, it was acquired by Korean conglomerate Samsung C&T Corporation and restructured as Whessoe Engineering Ltd.

Whessoe Varec
In 1997 Endress+Hauser acquired Whessoe Varec.

Controversies
Whessoe Oil and Gas was revealed as a subscriber to the UK's Consulting Association, exposed in 2009 for operating an illegal construction industry blacklist, and was among 14 issued with enforcement notices by the UK Information Commissioner's Office.

See also
 Varec code

Notes

References

Further reading

External links
 
 

Companies formerly listed on the London Stock Exchange
Companies based in County Durham
Darlington
Engineering companies of the United Kingdom
Nuclear technology companies of the United Kingdom